Samuel Dedetoku, popularly known by his stage name Sam Dede (born 17 November 1968), is a Nigerian veteran actor, director, politician and lecturer. Sam Dede as he is widely known in movies studied Theatre Arts at the University of Port Harcourt.

Biography 
Sam Dede was born on 17 November 1965 in Lagos and moved to Sapele.

Career 
He entered the Nollywood industry in 1995 and rose to prominence for his role in the film Ijele. In 2005, Dede won the Africa Movie Academy Award for Best Actor in a Supporting Role for his performance in the 2004 film The Mayors. He was honoured with SVAFF 2014 Special Recognition Award for his lifetime achievement and contributions to Nigerian cinema. He was nominated for the Africa Movie Academy Award for Best Actor in a Leading Role in 2018 for his performance in the 2017 film In My Country.

He was appointed as the Director-General of the Rivers State Tourism Development Agency in 2012 and served in the position for a short period of time. He is also a lecturer in the University of Port Harcourt teaching acting to upcoming actors. One of his students, Yul Edochie went onto become a lead actor in Nollywood. He however said in 2012 that he would not drop acting for politics.

Selected filmography 
Our Jesus Story (2020)
The Good Husband (2020)
The Legend of Inikpi (2020)
Kamsi (2018)
In My Country (2017)
The Lost Number (2012)
The Mayors (2004)
The Last Burial (2000)
Issakaba (2000)
Igodo (1999)
Blood Money (1997)
Mission to Nowhere
Darkest Night
Blood and Oil
Bumper to Bumper
Never Die for Love
5 Apostles
Undercover
Ijele
Ashes to Ashes
Gone

See also
 List of Nigerian actors
 List of Nigerian film producers
 List of Nigerian film directors

References

External links
Official website

1965 births
Living people
Nigerian male film actors
Nigerian male stage actors
Nigerian film directors
Rivers State politicians
Academic staff of the University of Port Harcourt
21st-century Nigerian male actors
Nigerian actor-politicians
Media people from Rivers State
Male actors from Rivers State
Heads of Rivers State government agencies and parastatals
University of Port Harcourt alumni
Nigerian male television actors
Nigerian politicians
People from Rivers State
Residents of Lagos